Demeter is usually the Greek grain goddess.  It may also refer to:

Astronomy:
 Demeter, name formerly used for Lysithea (moon), satellite of Jupiter, from 1955 to 1975
 1108 Demeter, asteroid

Literature:
 Demeter, an elegy by Philitas of Cos
 "Demeter" (1999), a sonnet by Carol Ann Duffy

Other:
 Demeter (surname)
 Demeter (cat), character from the musical Cats by Andrew Lloyd Webber
 Demeter (satellite) French micro-satellite launched 2004 with a 2-year planned lifetime, for developing earthquake prediction
 Demeter Fragrance Library, fragrance company
 Demeter International, certification organization for biodynamic farming
 Demeter, brand of electric guitar and bass guitar amplifier
 Demeter, terrain bot in Windows game Activeworlds
 Law of Demeter, software development design guideline ("Only talk to your immediate friends").
 USS Demeter (ARB-10), USS battle damage repair ship
 Demeter, the fictional Russian ship which brought Count Dracula to England in Bram Stoker's novel Dracula.
 Demeter, a freighter vessel in Egosoft's X (video game series) video game series

See also 

 Demetrius